Marie Wilson may refer to:

Marie Wilson (American actress) (1916–1972), American radio, film, and television actress
Marie Wilson (soap opera actress) (born 1974), American actress known for her roles on Port Charles and As the World Turns
Marie Wilson (American painter), wife of Nanos Valaoritis
Marie C. Wilson, feminist, author and political activist in the United States
Mari Wilson (born 1954), English pop singer of the 1980s
Marie Wilson (Australian singer), Australian singer-songwriter, featured on Twisted Angel and A Wonderful Life
Marie Wilson (journalist), Canadian journalist and commissioner of the Truth and Reconciliation Commission of Canada

See also
Mary Wilson (disambiguation)